Shake's Frozen Custard is a frozen custard retailer and franchise founded by Don and Debbie Osborne in Joplin, Missouri in 1991. It was originally opened as Shakey's Frozen Custard but was changed to Shake's in 2001 in order to secure trademarks.  The Osborne's experimented with a variety of recipes and menu items to devise their recipe. Corey Osborne, Don's oldest son, opened the second location in Fayetteville, Arkansas in 1997. Some of their popular menu items include concretes, sundaes, shakes, floats, splits, and more.

Franchise
In 1999, the company began offering franchises and incorporated in Arkansas as Shake's Frozen Custard, Inc.  Currently the franchise chain has nearly fifty stores in operation across nine states with many future locations planned.

See also
 List of frozen custard companies

References

External links 
 Official website

Companies based in Joplin, Missouri
Restaurants in Missouri
Restaurants in Texas
Economy of the Southeastern United States
Restaurants established in 1991
1991 establishments in Missouri
Frozen custard
Ice cream parlors in the United States